Amon N'Douffou V (born Enan Eboua Koutoua Francis) is king of the Kingdom of Sanwi in Ivory Coast, Africa. He was enthroned August 5, 2005, which was reported by AllAfrica.com to result in "popular jubilation". The coronation, held in  Krinjabo, took three days.

In August 2009, Amon N'Douffou V named American pastor Jesse Jackson a prince of the Kingdom of Sanwi. Jackson was the second to receive the title after American singer Michael Jackson received the same honor from Amon N'Douffou IV.

On March 7, 2010, Amon N'Douffou V made a speech to his people against the appropriation of land within the kingdom, which is often used for natural rubber farming.

On March 28, 2019, Amon N'Douffou V watched over the enthronement ceremony of the Baoulé people's new king, His Majesty Nanan Kassi Anvo.

In April 2019, Amon N'Douffou V stated he would donate funds to help to rebuild the Notre-Dame de Paris after the Notre-Dame de Paris fire. He stated, "The pictures  disturbed my sleep and I could not spend the night, because this cathedral represents a strong link between my kingdom and France."

References

External links
 Amon N'Douffou V on Twitter

21st-century monarchs in Africa
African kings
Living people
Year of birth missing (living people)